Thalian Hall was a historic building in Milledgeville, Georgia, U.S.  It was added to the National Register of Historic Places in 1978.

History
The three-story building was built by Joseph Lane, Jr. in 1860. The building was home to the Thalian Society, a literary society at Oglethorpe University, who used it as a dorm. Poet Sidney Lanier lived in this dorm as a student.  The building was demolished in 1990.

References

University and college buildings on the National Register of Historic Places in Georgia (U.S. state)
University and college buildings completed in 1860
Buildings and structures in Baldwin County, Georgia
Oglethorpe University
National Register of Historic Places in Baldwin County, Georgia
1860 establishments in Georgia (U.S. state)
Demolished buildings and structures in Georgia (U.S. state)
Buildings and structures demolished in 1990